The 2003 Tour de Suisse was the 67th edition of the Tour de Suisse cycle race and was held from 16 June to 25 June 2003. The race started in Egerkingen and finished in Aarau. The race was won by Alexander Vinokourov of the Telekom team.

Teams
Seventeen teams of up to eight riders started the race:

Route

General classification

References

2003
Tour de Suisse